The Short Life of Anne Frank is a 2001 Dutch television documentary film about the life of diarist Anne Frank. It was directed by Gerrit Netten. The film was narrated by several actors, including Jeremy Irons, Joachim Krol, and Bram Bart. Thekla Reuten and Nicky Morris provided voices for Anne Frank. The film includes the only known footage of Anne Frank (taken in 1941), a video of Otto Frank in English (taken in the 1960s), and some pages from the original diary of Anne Frank are also videoed in the film.

References

External links
 

Dutch documentary television films
2001 films
Documentary films about Anne Frank
2001 documentary films
The Holocaust in television